Albert Baines  was Archdeacon of Halifax from 1935 to 1946.

Baines was educated at St John's College, Cambridge. He was Curate of All Saints', Sheffield; and then held incumbencies in Newcastle-under-Lyme, St Helens, and Huddersfield before his appointment as Archdeacon. He died on 14 January 1951.

References

Alumni of St John's College, Cambridge
Archdeacons of Halifax
1951 deaths